Millsboro or Millboro may refer to:
Millsboro, Delaware
Millsboro, Pennsylvania
Millboro, South Dakota
Millboro, Virginia
Millsboro, West Virginia